Belgrade is a village in Nance County, Nebraska, United States. The population was 126 at the 2010 census.

History
Belgrade was established in 1889 when the Union Pacific Railroad was extended to that point. The village was named after Belgrade, capital of Serbia.

Geography
Belgrade is located at  (41.471327, -98.067302).

Demographics

2010 census
As of the census of 2010, there were 126 people, 57 households, and 38 families residing in the village. The racial makeup of the village was 99.2% White and 0.8% from two or more races. Hispanic or Latino of any race were 0.8% of the population.

There were 57 households, of which 24.6% had children under the age of 18 living with them, 56.1% were married couples living together, 7.0% had a female householder with no husband present, 3.5% had a male householder with no wife present, and 33.3% were non-families. 28.1% of all households were made up of individuals, and 14% had someone living alone who was 65 years of age or older. The average household size was 2.21 and the average family size was 2.61.

The median age in the village was 48.2 years. 18.3% of residents were under the age of 18; 9.5% were between the ages of 18 and 24; 16.7% were from 25 to 44; 37.2% were from 45 to 64; and 18.3% were 65 years of age or older. The gender makeup of the village was 52.4% male and 47.6% female.

2000 census
As of the census of 2000, there were 134 people, 63 households, and 36 families residing in the village. The population density was 730.3 people per square mile (287.4/km2). There were 77 housing units at an average density of 419.6 per square mile (165.2/km2). The racial makeup of the village was 100.00% White.

There were 63 households, out of which 23.8% had children under the age of 18 living with them, 47.6% were married couples living together, 4.8% had a female householder with no husband present, and 41.3% were non-families. 38.1% of all households were made up of individuals, and 15.9% had someone living alone who was 65 years of age or older. The average household size was 2.13 and the average family size was 2.73.

In the village, the population was spread out, with 23.9% under the age of 18, 6.7% from 18 to 24, 22.4% from 25 to 44, 28.4% from 45 to 64, and 18.7% who were 65 years of age or older. The median age was 42 years. For every 100 females, there were 94.2 males. For every 100 females age 18 and over, there were 92.5 males.

As of 2000 the median income for a household in the village was $28,750, and the median income for a family was $32,143. Males had a median income of $28,750 versus $21,875 for females. The per capita income for the village was $12,767. There were 12.5% of families and 15.8% of the population living below the poverty line, including no under eighteens and 33.3% of those over 64.

Notable people
Belgrade was the birthplace of Oregon Republican politician Norma Paulus, who served two terms each as Oregon Secretary of State and as Superintendent of Public Instruction. Paulus lost the 1986 Oregon gubernatorial race to Democrat Neil Goldschmidt.

References

Villages in Nance County, Nebraska
Villages in Nebraska